The 1975 South Orange Open, also known as the Tennis Week Open, was a men's tennis tournament played on outdoor clay courts at the Orange Lawn Tennis Club in South Orange, New Jersey in the United States. It was classified as a Group B category tournament and was part of the 1975 Grand Prix circuit. It was the sixth edition of the tournament on the Grand Prix circuit and was held from August 18 through August 24, 1975. Second-seeded Ilie Năstase won the singles title. The final was delayed for two days due to rain.

Finals

Singles
 Ilie Năstase defeated  Bob Hewitt 7–6, 6–1
 It was Năstase's 4th singles title of the year and the 50th of his career.

Doubles
 Jimmy Connors /  Ilie Năstase defeated  Dick Crealy /  John Lloyd 7–6, 7–5

References

External links
 ITF – South Orange tournament details

South Orange Open
South Orange Open
South Orange Open
South Orange Open
Tennis tournaments in New Jersey
South Orange Open